Dendrobeania is a genus of bryozoans belonging to the family Bugulidae.

The genus has almost cosmopolitan distribution.

Species:

Dendrobeania birostrata 
Dendrobeania curvirostrata 
Dendrobeania decorata 
Dendrobeania elongata 
Dendrobeania exilis 
Dendrobeania fessa 
Dendrobeania flustroides 
Dendrobeania formosissima 
Dendrobeania frigida 
Dendrobeania fruticosa 
Dendrobeania japonica 
Dendrobeania klugei 
Dendrobeania kurilensis 
Dendrobeania lamellosa 
Dendrobeania laxa 
Dendrobeania levinseni 
Dendrobeania lichenoides 
Dendrobeania longispinosa 
Dendrobeania multiseriata 
Dendrobeania murmanica 
Dendrobeania murrayana 
Dendrobeania myrrayana
Dendrobeania orientalis 
Dendrobeania ortmanni 
Dendrobeania pseudexilis 
Dendrobeania pseudolevinseni 
Dendrobeania pseudomurrayana 
Dendrobeania quadridentata 
Dendrobeania sessilis 
Dendrobeania simplex 
Dendrobeania sinica 
Dendrobeania tenuis

References

Bryozoan genera